Claire Waters Ferguson (born 1936) began skating at a young age and became a judge at age 16, working her way up to the national level and then to the Olympic level.  She attended Michigan State University where she was a member of Alpha Phi and graduated with a degree in communication skills and English in 1957.

In 1992, Ferguson became the first woman in the 75-year history of the United States Figure Skating Association to be named its president (1992-1995). Ferguson was president during the 1994 Winter Olympics and the Nancy Kerrigan/Tonya Harding incident. Ferguson was also the first woman elected to the International Federation for Figure Skaters. She serves on the International Skating Union Council, the first U.S. woman to do so.  She is on the board of directors of the Rhode Island Sports Council and a member of the Jamestown, Rhode Island Town Council.

See also
Tonya Harding and the attack on Kerrigan

References

External links
U.S. Figure Skating web site
Past Presidents of the USFSA
Three U.S. Figure Skating Representatives Elected to ISU Positions
Rhode Island Sports Council

Figure skating officials
Living people
Michigan State University alumni
People from Jamestown, Rhode Island
Rhode Island local politicians
1936 births
Women city councillors in Rhode Island
21st-century American women